John Alexander Cvitanovich (July 16, 1930 – January 8, 2002) was a Canadian football player who played for the BC Lions. He was a chartered accountant after retiring from professional football.

References

1930 births
2002 deaths
Sportspeople from Split, Croatia
Croatian emigrants to Canada
Yugoslav emigrants to Canada
Canadian football centres
BC Lions players